Millbrook Mountain is a mountain located in the Catskill Mountains of New York northwest of Benton Corners. It is located in Shawangunk Ridge. Millbrook Ridge is named after the nearby Mill Brook.  Mount Meenahga is located west-southwest of Millbrook Mountain. The mountain can be approached from either the Mohonk Preserve or Minnewaska State Park Reserve.

Gallery

References

External links

Mountains of Ulster County, New York
Mountains of New York (state)